Oan Djorkaeff (born 30 April 1997) is a French professional footballer who plays as a midfielder.

Early and personal life
Born in Milan, his father is Youri Djorkaeff. The family, which includes grandfather Jean Djorkaeff, uncle Micha Djorkaeff, and brother Sacha Djorkaeff is of Armenian descent.

Career
After playing in France for Saint-Étienne, Thonon Évian, Montpellier B and Nantes B, he signed for Scottish club St Mirren in July 2019 following a trial. He made his debut for the club in the Scottish League Cup on 14 July 2019. He left the club at the end of the 2019–20 season.

In October 2020 he signed for Swiss club SC Kriens.

References

1997 births
Living people
French footballers
AS Saint-Étienne players
Thonon Evian Grand Genève F.C. players
Montpellier HSC players
FC Nantes players
St Mirren F.C. players
SC Kriens players
Scottish Professional Football League players
Association football midfielders
French expatriate footballers
French expatriates in Scotland
Expatriate footballers in Scotland
French expatriate sportspeople in Switzerland
Expatriate footballers in Switzerland
Djorkaeff family
French people of Kalmyk descent
French people of Armenian descent
French people of Polish descent
Swiss Challenge League players